It Happened in Paris is the title of several films:

 It Happened in Paris (1919 film), an American crime drama
 It Happened in Paris (1932 film), starring Ranny Weeks, a remake of The Two Orphans (1915)
 It Happened in Paris (1935 film), a British romantic comedy
 It Happened in Paris (1952 film), a French comedy